Ian Anderson Plays the Orchestral Jethro Tull is a live album and DVD by Jethro Tull frontman
Ian Anderson, featuring the Neue Philharmonie Frankfurt, conducted by John O'Hara. The DVD was recorded at the Rosengarten in Mannheim on 8 December 2004.

The concert was part of a series of the same name. Anderson, O'Hara, and the orchestra toured Europe and the United States throughout 2004 and 2006.

Track listing
Note: track layout and timings for the double CD. The DVD contains the same songs in the same order, however the durations vary slightly.

Disc one
 "Eurology" ( Instrumental) – 3:30	  	
 "Calliandra Shade (The Cappuccino Song)" – 5:42	  	
 "Skating Away on the Thin Ice of the New Day" – 4:03	  	
 "Up the Pool" – 3:22	  	
 "We Five Kings" (Instrumental) – 3:32	  	
 "Life Is a Long Song" – 3:34
 "In the Grip of Stronger Stuff" (Instrumental) – 3:02	  	
 "Wond'ring Aloud" – 2:11	  	
 "Griminelli's Lament" (Instrumental) – 3:10 	  	
 "Cheap Day Return" – 1:27	  	
 "Mother Goose" – 5:46	  	
 "Bourée" (Instrumental) (J. S. Bach arr. Jethro Tull)" – 5:17  	
 "Boris Dancing" (Instrumental) – 3:31	  	
 "Living in the Past" – 4:48

Disc two
 "Pavane" (Instrumental) – 4:37	  	
 "Aqualung" – 10:24
 "God Rest Ye Merry Gentlemen" (Instrumental) – 4:58	  	
 "My God" – 8:52	
 "Budapest" – 14:04	  	
 "Locomotive Breath" – 6:42

DVD only 
 Interview Ian Anderson - 48:00
 Interview Fritz Rau - 7:00
 Interview participants - 9:00

Credits 
 Ian Anderson - flute, bamboo flute, acoustic guitar, vocals
 Florian Opahle - acoustic and electric guitar
 David Goodier - bass guitar, glockenspiel
 John O'Hara - keyboards, accordion
 James Duncan - drums, percussion

 Neue Philharmonie Frankfurt : Conducted by John O'Hara

Solo 
 Kathrin Troester - flute
 Astrid Cienia - oboe
 Sibylle Wähnert - bassoon

See also 
 A Classic Case
 Jethro Tull - The String Quartets
 Living with the Past
 Nothing Is Easy: Live at the Isle of Wight 1970

Notes 
 U.S. CD and DVD released October 4, 2005

References

External links 
 Ian Anderson Plays the Orchestral Jethro Tull at Allmovie
 Ian's thoughts on Orchestral Concerts
 Progressive Archives
 Album Review by David Randall
 DVD review by David Randall
 avreview.com
 Florian Opahle

Concert films
Ian Anderson albums
2005 live albums
Albums produced by Ian Anderson
Orchestral music
Jethro Tull (band)